Fawna MacLaren (born December 18, 1965) is an American model and actress. She was chosen as Playboys Playmate of the Month for January, 1989. She was born in Santa Monica, California.

She was selected as Playboy's 35th Anniversary Playmate after a nationwide search. She was paid $35,000 for her centerfold. Several years later, she appeared in one of Playboy'''s Wet & Wild'' home videos.

See also
 List of people in Playboy 1980–1989

References

External links

1965 births
Actresses from Santa Monica, California
American film actresses
Living people
1980s Playboy Playmates
21st-century American women